Bowie Tsang Po Yee (born 21 February 1973) is a Taiwanese television host, singer, actress, and writer. She is also known by her nickname Ah-Po.

Career 
She graduated with a bachelor's degree in sociology from National Taiwan University in 1995. While in college, she worked as an assistant producer at Zhen Yan She, a subsidiary of Rock Records. When she returned to Hong Kong, she worked different jobs behind the camera, such as being a script supervisor and production assistant, as her father, actor Eric Tsang, did not want support her career within the entertainment industry.

Tsang returned to Taiwan in 1997 and her first screen appearance as a host on Chung T'ien Television (formerly CTN). She was discovered by Taiwanese producer Chang Hsiao-yen, who signed Tsang to her management company in 1999.

From 1999 to 2003, she released six albums.

Tsang is well known in mainland China for her roles in television dramas.

She won Best Entertainment Program Host at the 2013 Golden Bell Awards.

In 2019, she was the interviewer on Grain Media's documentary series, The Eve of Tomorrow.

Personal life
Tsang has a younger sister and two younger half brothers. Her parents are Hong Kong actor Eric Tsang and his first wife, Taiwanese actress Wang Mei Hua (王美華). Her half brother Derek (from her father's second marriage) is also an actor. While her father stays in Hong Kong for his acting career, Tsang currently lives in Taiwan with her mother and her siblings.

She speaks Mandarin, Hokkien, Cantonese, Hakka, English, and some Japanese.

Selected filmography

Hosting
 TVBS-G《Super Live 3-5》
 台灣電視公司《綜藝旗艦 Hello Jacky!》
 TVBS-G《晚安各位觀眾》
 TVBS-G《哈囉各位觀眾》
 飛碟電台《飛碟小點心，寶貝七點鐘》
 香港亞洲電視《亞洲星光大道》
 Taiwan Television - 百萬小學堂
 Let's Go Home (2020)
 Let's Go Home (2022; season 2) 
 Music Viva Viva (2022)

As actress

Discography

Bibliography
 《阿寶靚湯》
 《阿寶靚湯2：寶媽寶妹幸福湯》
 《阿寶靚湯3：美人湯．孕婦湯42品》
 《阿寶靚湯4：40道養生美容素食湯方》
 《寶媽寶妹交換日記：不能和媽媽說的事》

References

External links

1973 births
Living people
Taiwanese people of Hakka descent
National Taiwan University alumni
Taiwanese people of Hong Kong descent
Hakka musicians
Taiwanese television presenters
Taiwanese television actresses
Hong Kong television actresses
Hong Kong television presenters
21st-century Hong Kong actresses
21st-century Taiwanese actresses
Taiwanese film actresses
Hong Kong film actresses
Hong Kong people of Hakka descent
20th-century Hong Kong actresses
20th-century Taiwanese actresses
21st-century Taiwanese singers
21st-century Taiwanese women singers
Taiwanese women television presenters
Hong Kong women television presenters
The Amazing Race contestants